"That Part" (stylized as "THat Part") is a hip hop song by American hip hop recording artist Schoolboy Q featuring Kanye West. It was released on May 13, 2016 by Top Dawg Entertainment and Interscope Records, as the lead single from Schoolboy Q's fourth album Blank Face LP, and was produced by Cardo, Yung Exclusive, Cubeatz and Sounwave. The song was nominated for Best Rap Performance at the 59th Annual Grammy Awards. HipHopDX named it the ninth best hip-hop song of 2016.

Accolades
German magazine Juice named it the fourth best international rap song of 2016.

Music video
The song's music video, directed by Colin Tilley, was released on June 2, 2016. As of September 2020, the music video has accumulated over 187 million views, making it his most viewed video on his Vevo channel.

Live performances
In June 2016, Schoolboy Q performed a live rendition of "That Part", in a medley with "Groovy Tony", on The Late Show with Stephen Colbert.

Black Hippy remix
"That Part" was later remixed, featuring new verses from Schoolboy Q and his Black Hippy cohorts Jay Rock, Kendrick Lamar and Ab-Soul, which was released on July 8, 2016. The remix was later released for purchase via digital distribution on July 16.

Commercial performance 
In the US, on the Billboard chart dated June 4, 2016, "That Part" made a debut at number 92 on the chart. The following week, the single completely fell off of the chart, however, on the chart dated July 2, the song re-entered at a new peak of number 76, due to the announcement and anticipation of his then-upcoming album Blank Face LP. In the following weeks, the song climbed up, eventually reaching a new peak of number 40, becoming his second top 40 hit as a lead artist and fourth overall, and his second highest position behind 2014's "Studio", which peaked at number 38, two years earlier. The record has thus charted for 13 weeks by far for the date ending September 17. In New Zealand, the single failed to crack the top 40, however, it peaked at number six on the Heatseekers chart, making it his first appearance as a lead artist in that country with the debut coming from the release and chart debut of his sophomore album with another song titled "By Any Means", also charting in the same chart at number eight.

After the song reached number 40 on the US Billboard Hot 100 chart, Kanye West surpassed Michael Jackson with his fortieth top 40 hit on the chart.

Charts

Weekly charts

Year-end charts

Certifications

Release history

References

External links
Lyrics of this song at Genius

2016 singles
Schoolboy Q songs
Kanye West songs
Top Dawg Entertainment singles
Interscope Records singles
Songs written by Schoolboy Q
Songs written by Kanye West
Music videos directed by Colin Tilley
Song recordings produced by Kanye West
Song recordings produced by Cubeatz
Songs written by Sounwave
Songs written by Kevin Gomringer
Songs written by Tim Gomringer
Songs written by Cardo (record producer)